The name Harold has been assigned to two tropical cyclones in the Australian region, while the similar name Herold has been used for one in the South-West Indian Ocean.

In the Australian region:
 Cyclone Harold (1997)
 Cyclone Harold (2020), a Category 5 severe tropical cyclone that moved into the South Pacific basin and impacted the Solomon Islands, Vanuatu, Fiji and Tonga.

In the South-West Indian Ocean:
 Cyclone Herold (2020), affected Madagascar and the Mascarene Islands.

Australian region cyclone set index articles